Trihydroxyflavone may refer to:

 Apigenin (5,7,4'-trihydroxyflavone)
 Baicalein (5,6,7-trihydroxyflavone)
 Norwogonin (5,7,8-Trihydroxyflavone)
 Galangin (3,5,7-trihydroxyflavone)
 7,8,3'-Trihydroxyflavone (7,8,3'-THF)
 6,7,4'-Trihydroxyflavone (6,7,4'-THF)